Innovations in Modern Music is an album by pianist and bandleader Stan Kenton with his "Innovations" Orchestra featuring performances recorded in 1950 and originally released on the Capitol label.

Reception

The AllMusic review by Scott Yanow observed "The music is often quite fascinating and very advanced".

Track listing
 "Trajectories" (Franklyn Marks) – 3:34
 "Theme for Sunday" (Stan Kenton) – 5:04
 "Conflict" (Pete Rugolo) – 4:27
 "Incident in Jazz" (Robert Graettinger) – 3:31
 "The Lonesome Road" (Nathaniel Shilkret, Gene Austin) – 4:30
 "Mirage" (Rugolo) – 4:59
 "Solitaire" (Bill Russo) – 4:17
 "Cuban Episode" (Chico O'Farrill) – 4:46
Recorded at Capitol Recording Studios in Hollywood, CA on February 3, 1950 (tracks 2, 3, 6 & 7) and February 4, 1950 (tracks 1, 4, 5 & 8)

Personnel
Stan Kenton – piano, arranger
Alfred "Chico" Alvarez, Buddy Childers, Maynard Ferguson, Don Paladino, Shorty Rogers – trumpet 
Milt Bernhart, Harry Betts, Bob Fitzpatrick, Bill Russo – trombone 
Bart Varsalona – bass trombone
John Graas, Lloyd Otto – French horn 
Gene Englund – tuba 
Art Pepper – alto saxophone, clarinet 
Bud Shank – alto saxophone, flute 
Bob Cooper – tenor saxophone, oboe, English horn 
Bart Caldarell – tenor saxophone, bassoon 
Bob Gioga – baritone saxophone, bass clarinet 
Jim Cathcart, Earl Cornwell, Anthony Doria, Lew Elias, Jim Holmes, George Kast, Alex Law, Herbert Offner, Carl Ottobrino, Dave Schackne – violin 
Stan Harris, Leonard Sclic, Sam Singer – viola 
Gregory Bemko, Zachary Bock, Jack Wulfe – cello 
Laurindo Almeida – guitar 
Don Bagley – bass 
Shelly Manne – drums, tympani 
Carlos Vidal – congas 
June Christy – vocals (tracks 3 & 5)

References

Stan Kenton albums
1950 albums
Capitol Records albums
Albums arranged by Bill Russo
Albums arranged by Pete Rugolo
Albums conducted by Stan Kenton